L'Hommedieu may refer to:

L'Hommedieu (surname)
Ezra L'Hommedieu (1734–1811), American lawyer and politician
Stephen S. L'Hommedieu (1806–1875), American newspaper publisher and railroad executive
Wallace L'Hommedieu (1833–1916), American politician
Irving L'Hommedieu (1865–1931), American lawyer and politician

L'Hommedieu (middle name)
Stephen L'Hommedieu Slocum (1859–1933), American military attaché
Tillinghast L'Hommedieu Huston (1867–1938), American civil engineer and baseball team owner
Colden L'Hommedieu Ruggles (1869–1933), American general